Clifford Chukwuma  is a former Nigerian football player and is the current head coach of the SESA Football Academy in India.

Chukwuma's son, Chukwudi Chukwuma, currently plays for FK Teplice of the Czech First League.

Coaching career

Sporting Goa
Chukwuma managed Sporting Goa in I-League from 2008 to 2009.

SESA FA
After leaving Sporting Goa, Chukwuma became the head coach at the SESA Football Academy.

References

External links
 SESA FA profile.

Living people

Nigerian footballers
Nigerian football managers
Sporting Clube de Goa managers
I-League managers
Nigerian expatriate sportspeople in India
Nigerian expatriate football managers
Expatriate football managers in India
Association footballers not categorized by position
Year of birth missing (living people)